Atlas is a bronze statue in Rockefeller Center, within the International Building's courtyard, in Midtown Manhattan in New York City. It is across Fifth Avenue from St. Patrick's Cathedral. The sculpture depicts the ancient Greek Titan Atlas holding the heavens on his shoulders.

Atlas was created by the sculptor Lee Lawrie with the help of Rene Paul Chambellan and was installed in 1937. The sculpture is in the Art Deco style of Rockefeller Center. It weighs , and is the largest sculpture at Rockefeller Center.

Atlas is depicted carrying the celestial vault on his shoulders. The north-south axis of the armillary sphere on his shoulders points towards the North Star's position relative to New York City. The statue stands on one muscular leg atop a small stone pedestal, whose corner faces Fifth Avenue.

In popular culture
The piece has since been appropriated as a symbol of the Objectivist movement and has been associated with Ayn Rand's novel Atlas Shrugged (1957).

It has been featured in almost every episode of the television series 30 Rock, appearing in numerous establishing shots depicting the 30 Rockefeller Plaza building, where the series is set. Most Rainforest Cafe locations have a statue resembling this one in a waterfall with a fountain, with the words "Rescue the Rainforest" in green neon letters across the equator of the globe.

Ridley Scott has cited the sculpture as the aesthetic inspiration for the character "Mother," on HBO Max's Raised by Wolves.

See also
Atlas (architecture)
Farnese Atlas

References

External links

Atlas (sculpture)

1937 establishments in New York City
1937 sculptures
Art Deco sculptures and memorials
Bronze sculptures in Manhattan
Buildings and structures completed in 1937
Nude sculptures in New York (state)
Outdoor sculptures in Manhattan
Rockefeller Center
Sculptures of Greek gods
Statues in New York City
Atlas (mythology)